Arthur Hogg (20 June 1877 – 21 April 1956) was an English cricketer who played first-class cricket for Derbyshire in 1905 and 1906.

Hogg was born in Pentrich, the son of John Hogg, a coal miner and his wife Ann. He made his first appearance for Derbyshire during the 1905 season  in a match against Lancashire when he scored a single run in his first innings of a drawn match. His next game was in the 1906 season against Surrey in July, when he scored a career-best of 4 in the second innings. His final game was later that season against Yorkshire when he did not score in either innings. Derbyshire lost both those matches. Hogg was a right-handed batsman and played 6 innings in 3 first-class matches with a total run count of 5.

Hogg died in Ripley at the age of 79.

References

1877 births
1956 deaths
English cricketers
Derbyshire cricketers